Battlelore are a Finnish heavy metal band from Lappeenranta, founded in 1999 by guitarist Jyri Vahvanen and bassist Miika Kokkola. The name derives from the union of the words 'battle' and 'folklore'. Many of Battlelore's lyrics concern J. R. R. Tolkien's Middle-earth sagas and their stage costumes and live shows are largely inspired by the themes and characters of fantasy literature. The band had many changes of personnel during their twelve years of activity and had a long hiatus after the completion of the tour supporting their latest release Doombound in 2011. In January 2016 they announced that they would be performing at Metal Female Voices Fest XIII in October 2016.

History

The first demo and Napalm Records (1999–2004) 

Battlelore's first demo Warrior's Tale was released in late 1999, the same year of the founding of the group, but Battlelore attracted the attention of the Austrian record label Napalm Records only after the publication of the second demo Dark Fantasy in late 2000, which featured for the first time long standing members Kaisa Jouhki as female singer, Henri Vahvanen on drums and Maria Honkanen on keyboards. Under request from the label, the band recorded an untitled 3-tracks demo before finally signing the contract.

In the fall of 2001, the band was at Music Bros. Studios to record their debut album with producer Miitri Aaltonen.

Around this time, guitarist Tommi Havo left the band for personal reasons and was replaced by the current lead guitarist Jussi Rautio. The debut album, ...Where the Shadows Lie, which includes re-recorded songs coming from early demos, was published in 2002 with good success. A video for the song "Journey to Undying Lands" was shot to promote the album. However, Battlelore are best known for their second album Sword's Song, registered like the first one at Music Bros. Studios with Miitri Aaltonen as producer and released in the spring of 2003, defined by many as their best. The album was successful and led the group to their first European tour.

In 2004, the band released their first DVD, The Journey, containing the recording of a concert held at the prestigious Finnish Tavastia Club in Helsinki, a documentary and video clips.

Change of formation and Third Age of the Sun (2004–2005) 

In 2004 singer Patrik Mennander left the band, because of lack of time to devote to Battlelore, and his place was taken at first temporarily and then officially by the former frontman of the band Evemaster, Tomi Mykkänen. Mennander's last concert was at a show as headliner band at the RingCon (the official festival of The Lord of the Rings in Bonn, Germany). Bassist and founding member Miika Kokkola also left the band for personal reasons and was replaced by Timo Honkanen, a former tour roadie.

With this new line-up, the band released in 2005 their third studio album, Third Age of the Sun, recorded at Sound Suite Studios, in the spring of 2005 and produced by Terje Refsnes, for the promotion of which the video for "Storm of the Blades" was filmed. Music critics judged Third Age of the Sun inferior compared to previous records, partly due to the defection of Mennander and Kokkola. However, the album presents a more varied and ambitious songwriting, mixing folk tunes and a symphonic vein, rendered through the more prominent use of keyboards and the temporary waiver of clean male vocals, which, however, reappeared in the next album.

The album entered in the Finnish charts at number 38.

Touring in Europe, more albums, and hiatus (2006–2011) 

After attending the Wacken Open Air festival of 2006, in the fall Battlelore started recording their fourth album, again with Miitri Aaltonen at Music Bros Studios, which was published in early 2007 with the title Evernight, anticipated by the video for the song "House of Heroes". Many defined Evernight the darkest album of the Finnish group, but also their best since Sword's Song.

In the early days of September, a European tour planned for November with Draconian and Darzamat was announced, but the tour was later canceled.

In January 2007, guitarist Vahvanen temporarily left the band to travel through Asia for six months, and was replaced by Tommy Lintunen, which appears in the video for "House of Heroes". On his return in June, Vahvanen took back his place as guitarist.

In September, it was announced that the Finnish band would open the November dates of After Forever in Helsinki and Tampere, but the dates were deleted by the promoter and in November Battlelore were also excluded from the European tour with Korpiklaani, scheduled for December. On 20 October 2007 the band was at the Metal Female Voices Fest and the performance was recorded to be part of a live DVD.

In the period from April to May 2008, their fifth album The Last Alliance was recorded at Sound Supreme Studios in Hämeenlinna with Dan Swanö as producer. The album was published in September, preceded by the video for the song "Third Immortal". After a week from release, the album reached position twenty-sixth in the best-selling albums chart in Finland. Battlelore were part of 'The Finnish Fire Tour' along Korpiklaani, Falchion and Kivimetsän Druidi, but singer Mykkänen had to be replaced by Harri Hyytiäinen, a member of Avathar for personal problems.
The album was also released in a special edition with a DVD, including the recording of the Metal Female Voices Fest 2007 concert

During the summer, the place of drummer was taken temporarily by Enrico Annus, because of Henri Vahvanen's other personal commitments.

In July 2009, it was announced that the group had renewed the contract with Napalm Records, ended with The Last Alliance, providing label support for the band's next album and its promotional tour.

In late September 2009, the band embarked on a brief tour of six dates in England together with Finntroll and in December it was announced that the sixth album was in preparation and Battlelore would have entered the studio around June–July 2010 for the recordings. The publication was intended for October  2010 and then moved to early 2011.

Doombound was recorded again at Sound Supreme Studios with Janne Saksa, with Dan Swanö at mixing duties. Stylistically, the album marked a return to the sound of the first records and it was Battlelore's first concept album, focusing on the figure of Túrin Turambar.
The album contains eleven songs, including one instrumental and one sung in Finnish language to celebrate Finland and the Finnish epic poem, the Kalevala. The special edition of the album contains the DVD 10 Years of Battlelore, with many special features.

On 23 October 2011, the group announced via their website an indefinite break from the music scene, indicating that this is not a final farewell.

Reunion show and The Return of the Shadow (2016, 2022-present) 

In January 2016, they announced that they would be performing a reunion concert at Metal Female Voices Fest XIII in October 2016.

On 3 June 2022, they will release their seventh studio album titled The Return of the Shadow. The album will be the band's first album in over a decade.

Style and influences 

Battlelore mixes female vocals with harsh male growling in "beauty and the beast" duets, backed by heavy guitar riffing and occasional keyboard interludes. The band's style takes elements from gothic metal, folk metal, power metal and melodic death metal. Because of the variety of Battlelore's music, different reviewers have labeled the band with each of these genres, as well as idiosyncratic terms such as "epic metal" or "fantasy metal". Guitarist and founder Jyri Vahvanen described the music of Battlelore as "fantasy metal" and "very bombastic, epic and melodic metal".

According to Battlelore's official MySpace website, Bolt Thrower, Emperor, The Gathering, Kyuss, Black Sabbath, Morbid Angel, Katatonia, Anathema, My Dying Bride, Iron Maiden, W.A.S.P., Zakk Wylde, Dissection and Theatre of Tragedy are some of the artists who influenced the music of the band.

Battlelore's lyrics are about Middle-earth characters and events described by the British author J. R. R. Tolkien in The Lord of the Rings trilogy of books and in The Silmarillion. More lyrical inspiration comes from medieval literature and the Kalevala. Starting with the album Evernight, the band deliberately decided not to use names or places taken from the imaginary of Tolkien, although his works remain the main inspiration for their lyrics.

The same inspiration marks the band's distinctive pseudo-medieval stage show, in which each member is dressed up in costumes and fantasy makeup to look like "ferocious warriors", "dirty thieves" or "beautiful female elves".

Members

Current members 

Jyri Vahvanen – rhythm guitar (1999-present)
Kaisa Jouhki – female vocals (2000-present)
Henri Vahvanen – drums (2000-present)
Maria Honkanen – keyboards, flute (2000-present)
Jussi Rautio – lead guitar (2002-present)
Tomi Mykkänen – male vocals (2004-present)
Timo Honkanen – bass (2004-present)

Former members 

 Miika Kokkola – bass (1999–2004)
 Patrik Mennander – male vocals (1999–2004)
 Tommi Havo – vocals (1999–2000), lead guitar (2000–2002)
 Jarkko Heilimo (a.k.a. Gorthaur) – drums (1999–2000)
 Arto Mäkikuusela – keyboards (1999–2000)

Guest musicians 

 Erik Zacharias – synthesizer
 Jyrki Myllärien – classical guitar

Timeline

Discography

Studio albums

Promo albums 
 Warrior's Tale (2000)
 Dark Fantasy (2001)

DVDs 
 The Journey (2004)

Videos 
 "Journey to Undying Lands" (2002)
 "Storm of the Blades" (2005)
 "House of Heroes" (2007)
 "Third Immortal" (2008)

References

External links 

Official website
[ Battlelore] at Allmusic

Musical groups established in 1999
Music based on Middle-earth
Lappeenranta
Finnish gothic metal musical groups
Finnish power metal musical groups
Finnish folk metal musical groups
Napalm Records artists
Seven-string guitarists
1999 establishments in Finland